Rutland is an unincorporated community in Union Township, Marshall County, Indiana.

History
The first post office at Rutland was called Cavender, established 1883. Renamed Rutland in 1884, the post office closed in 1918.

Rutland was a station on the New York, Chicago and St. Louis Railroad.

Geography

References

Unincorporated communities in Marshall County, Indiana
Unincorporated communities in Indiana